Apamea Myrlea was an ancient city and bishopric (Apamea in Bithynia) on the Sea of Marmara, in Bithynia, Anatolia; its ruins are a few kilometers south of Mudanya, Bursa Province in the Marmara Region of Asian Turkey.

Name 
To distinguish this city from the many others called Apamea, the name Apamea Myrlea used here adds to the name (Apamea) it was given when rebuilt as an important city the name (Myrlea) it previously bore as a smaller town. It was also referred to as Apamea Myrlēon (Apamea of Myrlea).

History 
The town was founded as a colony of the Colophonians and was called Μύρλεια (Myrleia or Myrlea). Philip V of Macedon took the town, as it appears, during his war against the king of Pergamon, and gave it to his ally, King Prusias I of Bithynia, who fortified and enlarged it – indeed almost rebuilt it – around 202 BC, renaming it Ἀπάμεια (transcribed as Apameia, Apamea, or Apamia), after his wife, Apama III.

The place was on the west coast of the Gulf of Gemlik, and northwest of Bursa, then called Prusa, for which it served as a port.

The Romans made Apamea a colonia, apparently in the time of Augustus, or perhaps Julius Caesar, in view of the adjective "Iulia" that appear on its coins under Roman rule. Its earlier coins were stamped Ἀπαμέων Μυρλεάνων, but in Roman times they bore the label C.I.C.A. (= Colonia Iulia Concordia Apamea).

When Pliny the Younger was governor of Bithynia, he consulted Trajan about a claim by the colonia not to have its accounts of receipts and expenditures examined by the Roman governor.

A passage of Ulpian shows use of the adjectival form of the name was Apamenus: "Apamena: est in Bithynia colonia Apamena.

Ecclesiastical history 
This Apamea in the Late Roman province of Bithynia became the seat of a Christian bishop in the 4th century and was at first a suffragan of Nicaea, but became an autocephalous archdiocese some time before the Fourth Council of Constantinople (Roman Catholic) in 869, at which its archbishop Paulus took part.

Titular see 
No longer a residential bishopric, Apamea in Bithynia is today listed by the Catholic Church as a titular see, of the intermediary Archiepiscopal rank.

Since the Latin Catholic archdiocese was thus nominally restored (in ?1633), it has had the following archiepiscopal incumbents, but is vacant since decades :
 Nicola Maria Tedeschi, Benedictines (O.S.B.) (1722.03.02 – death 1741.09.29), eemritate as former Bishop of Lipari (Italy) (1710.03.10 – 1722.02.28)
 Stefano Evodio Assemani (1736 – death 1782.11.24), no actual office recorded
 Luigi Ruffo Scilla (1785.04.11 – 1801.02.23), as Apostolic Nuncio (papal ambassador) to Austria-Hungary (1793.08.23 – 1802.08.09); later Metropolitan Archbishop of Napoli (Naples) (southern Italy) (1802.08.09 – death 1832.11.17), created Cardinal-Priest of S. Martino ai Monti (1802.08.09 – 1832.11.17), became Protopriest of Sacred College of Cardinals (1830.01.24 – 1832.11.17)
 David Mathew (1946.02.20 – death 1975.12.12), first as Apostolic Delegate (papal legation chief) to British East Africa and British West Africa (1946.02.20 – 1953), then Military Vicar of Great Britain (UK) (1954.04.16 – retired 1963.03.23); previously Titular Bishop of Æliæ (1938.12.03 – 1946.02.20) as Auxiliary Bishop of Westminster (England) (1938.12.03 – 1946.02.20)

See also
 List of ancient Greek cities

References

Sources and external links 
 GCatholic, with incumbent bio links

Further reading 
 Richard Talbert, Barrington Atlas of the Greek and Roman World,, p. 52.
 Stephanus of Byzantium, s. v. Apameia

Archaeological sites in the Marmara Region
Ancient Greek archaeological sites in Turkey
Former populated places in Turkey
Geography of Bursa Province
History of Bursa Province
Bithynian colonies
History of Bursa
Populated places in Bithynia